The Livny (Livenskaya) is a general purpose pig breed from Russia.

References

Pig breeds originating in Russia
Animal breeds originating in the Soviet Union